County Kilburn is a 2000 British comedy film directed by Elliot Hegarty and starring Ciarán McMenamin, Rick Warden and John Bowe.

Plot
A young man takes a job working at The Waggon and Horses, an Irish bar in Kilburn in North London, where a number of eccentric patrons do their drinking.

Cast
 Ciarán McMenamin ...  Mickey 
 Rick Warden ...  Johno 
 John Bowe ...  Black Jack 
 Georgia Mackenzie ...  Sue 
 Patrick Duggan ...  Dean 
 Kay D'Arcy ...  Torvill 
 Norman Rodway ...  Mr. Bollox 
 Simon Sherlock ...  Billy 
 Tony Bluto ...  Basic 
 James Duggan ...  Barry 
 Les Doherty ...  Priest 
 Ryan Pope ...  Builder 
 Paul O'Grady ...  Himself

References

External links
 

2000 films
2000 comedy films
British comedy films
2000s English-language films
2000s British films